WFDR (1370 kHz) is an AM radio station broadcasting a classic hits format. It is licensed to serve Manchester, Georgia, United States, south-southwest of metro Atlanta.  The station is currently owned by Legacy Media Holdings, LLC.

The stations' call letters WFDR are a reference to former U.S. President Franklin D. Roosevelt, who had his Little White House vacation home in nearby Warm Springs, Georgia.

As of September 12, 2016, WFDR is being relayed on FM translator W247CJ at 97.3 MHz.

In or around 2019, Christopher Murray's Georgia Radio Alliance acquired WFDR and flipped it to "Fox FM" with a Classic Hits format resembling its Macon/Warner Robins area sister station WBML.
In January 2021, WFDR began simulcasting on 102.1 W271CV in Atlanta via 96.1 WWPW-HD4.

Previous logo

References

External links

FDR
Radio stations established in 1970
1970 establishments in Georgia (U.S. state)